Katalin Oláh (born 6 July 1968) is a Hungarian orienteering competitor. She won the 1991 and 1995 Classic distance World Orienteering Championships.

References

External links

1968 births
Living people
Hungarian orienteers
Female orienteers
Foot orienteers
World Orienteering Championships medalists
Date of birth missing (living people)
Place of birth missing (living people)
Competitors at the 2001 World Games